The heavy metal music tour, Mayhem Festival 2011, was the fourth annual Mayhem Festival created by Kevin Lyman. The official lineup was announced on January 31, 2011. It was the first year that the festival utilized a rotating main stage slot, and the first year that the tour had more than one act returning from previous lineups.

Rotating Main Stage openers
The 2011 iteration of Mayhem Festival was notable as the first year in which the tour utilized multiple acts to fill the opening slot on the Main stage on different ranges of days. Machine Head opened the Main stage from the tour's onset until July 20, Trivium performed from July 22 to August 2, and In Flames played from August 3 until they dropped off the tour. While one band opened the main stage, the other two instead performed as headliners on the Jägermeister Mobile Stage and Revolver Stage.

In Flames drops off festival
On July 31, Swedish band In Flames announced that they would not be able to continue touring with the festival by posting this on their official website: "It is with huge regret that today with immediate effect In Flames must cancel their current US shows as part of the Mayhem tour and their own US Headline shows. Due to a serious terminal illness of one [of] the band's immediate family members they feel they have no option. We have had the most amazing and fun times as part of the Mayhem tour and we are truly grateful for all the support the whole festival has shown. We will be back at the start of 2012. Once again our apologies"

Mayhem Festival 2011 lineup

Main Stage
 Disturbed
 Godsmack
 Megadeth
 Dethklok (replaced Megadeth on 7/09)

Rotating Main Stage openers
 Machine Head
 Trivium
 In Flames
 Hatebreed (Replaced Trivium between 8/5/11 - 8/7/11)

Revolver Stage
 Testament (headlined 7/31-8/14, replacing In Flames)
 Suicide Silence
 All Shall Perish (cancelled July 24, replaced by The Athiarchists for that date)
 Straight Line Stitch

Jägermeister Mobile Stage
 The Athiarchists (headlining in place of In Flames after 7/31)
 Unearth
 Kingdom of Sorrow
 Red Fang
 Jägermeister Battle of the Bands winner

Tour dates

References

External links

Pictures/Review Mayhem Festival 7/9 San Manuel Amphitheater

Mayhem Festival by year
2011 concert tours
2011 music festivals
2011 festivals in the United States
July 2011 events in the United States
August 2011 events in the United States